Italienisches Liederbuch (English: Italian songbook) is a collection of 46 Lieder (songs for voice and piano) by Hugo Wolf (18601903). The first 22 songs (Book 1) were composed between September 1890 and December 1891, and published in 1892. The other 24 songs (Book 2) were composed between March and August 1896, and published the same year. The time lag between the two volumes was caused by Wolf's long-proposed opera, Der Corregidor (1895), which might have been inspired by his personal love triangle with his friend’s wife Melanie Köchert. The 46 lyrics of the songs were taken from an anthology of Italian poems by Paul Heyse (18301914), translated into German and published with the title of Italienisches Liederbuch in 1860. Despite Heyse’s diverse poetic selections, Wolf preferred the rispetto, a short Italian verse usually consisting of eight lines of ten or eleven syllables each, as a result of which the songs are short.

Description 
It is usually performed by alternating baritone and soprano singers, as (for example) in the recording of Dietrich Fischer-Dieskau (baritone), Elisabeth Schwarzkopf (soprano), and Gerald Moore (accompanist). In the lyrics, the male in love tends to idealize his lover and praise her beauty, while the female shows practical ideas about love and sometimes has complaints against her lover.

The poems 
The German texts and some translations are available online at The LiederNet Archive. The poems are listed below:

 Book 1
 "Auch kleine Dinge"
 "Mir ward gesagt, du reisest in die Ferne"
 "Ihr seid die Allerschönste"
 "Gesegnet sei, durch den die Welt entstund"
 "Selig ihr Blinden"
 "Wer rief dich denn?"
 "Der Mond hat eine schwere Klag' erhoben"
 "Nun laß uns Frieden schließen"
 "Daß doch gemalt all' deine Reize wären"
 "Du denkst mit einem Fädchen"
 "Wie lange schon war immer mein Verlangen"
 "Nein, junger Herr"
 "Hoffärtig seid Ihr, schönes Kind"
 "Geselle, woll'n wir uns in Kutten hüllen"
 "Mein Liebster ist so klein"
 "Ihr jungen Leute"
 "Und willst du deinen Liebsten sterben sehen"
 "Heb' auf dein blondes Haupt"
 "Wir haben beide"
 "Mein Liebster singt"
 "Man sagt mir, deine Mutter woll' es nicht"
 "Ein Ständchen Euch zu bringen"

 Book 2
 "Was für ein Lied soll dir gesungen werden"
 "Ich esse nun mein Brot nicht trocken mehr"
 "Mein Liebster hat zu Tische mich geladen"
 "Ich ließ mir sagen"
 "Schon streckt' ich aus im Bett die müden Glieder"
 "Du sagst mir daß ich keine Fürstin sei"
 "Wohl kenn' ich Euren Stand"
 "Laß sie nur geh'n"
 "Wie soll ich fröhlich sein"
 "Was soll der Zorn"
 "Sterb' ich, so hüllt in Blumen meine Glieder"
 "Und steht Ihr früh am Morgen auf"
 "Benedeit die sel'ge Mutter"
 "Wenn du, mein Liebster, steigst zum Himmel auf"
 "Wie viele Zeit verlor' ich"
 "Wenn du mich mit den Augen streifst"
 "Gesegnet sei das Grün"
 "O wär' dein Haus durchsichtig wie ein Glas"
 "Heut' Nacht erhob ich mich um Mitternacht"
 "Nicht länger kann ich singen"
 "Schweig' einmal still"
 "O wüßtest du, wie viel ich deinetwegen"
 "Verschling' der Abgrund"
 "Ich hab' in Penna einen Liebsten wohnen"

References 

Compositions by Hugo Wolf
1892 compositions
1896 compositions
Classical song cycles in German
Lieder
Musical settings of poems by Paul Heyse